Samuela Ravanua Domoni Junior (25 December 1968 – 24 July 2021) was a Fijian former rugby union footballer and the former national coach of the Fiji national rugby union team. He played as a lock or flanker.

He played Super Rugby for NSW Waratahs. He also played for English clubs, London Irish and Saracens.

He played for Fiji 6 times between 1990 and 1991 and was part of the Fiji team to the 1991 Rugby World Cup. He made his test debut for Fiji in December 1990, against Hong Kong.

After retiring from rugby, he coached the Combined Penrith and Zion Lions between 1999 and 2000. Between 2002–03, he coached The Entrance rugby club based in New South Wales. He was appointed the skills and assistant coach for the Manly Rugby club in 2004 before joining the Penrith 7's rugby club in 2005. He was appointed the Fiji head coach in 2010 after his predecessor, Ilivasi Tabua was fired.

After a dismal 2011 RWC, he was fired and replaced by assistant coach, Inoke Male as head coach.

Domoni's death was reported 24 July 2021, at the age of 52. He died of Covid-19.

References

External links
 Scrum Profile
 Fiji Rugby profile
 IRB profile / IRB profile 2

1968 births
2021 deaths
Fijian rugby union players
Rugby union locks
Rugby union flankers
Fiji national rugby union team coaches
Fijian rugby union coaches
New South Wales Waratahs players
London Irish players
Saracens F.C. players
Fijian expatriate rugby union players
Expatriate rugby union players in Australia
Expatriate rugby union players in England
Fijian expatriate sportspeople in Australia
Fijian expatriate sportspeople in England
I-Taukei Fijian people
Fiji international rugby union players